The women's 10 km pursuit competition of the 2015 Winter Universiade was held at the National Biathlon Centre in Osrblie on January 28.

Results

References 

Women's 10km
2015 in Slovak women's sport